A ball pump needle is a metal device through which air passes from a pump into an inflatable sports ball, such as the balls used in soccer, volleyball, basketball, rugby, handball or water polo. Using a lubricant facilitates the insertion of the needle. A ball needle is related to a ball pump.

References
Soccerballworld retrieved dec.2017

Sports equipment
Valves